Invincible Youth is a South Korean variety show which aired its first season on KBS2 from October 23, 2009 to December 24, 2010. Season 1 featured seven girls (collectively known as G7) from K-pop idol groups wherein they experience how it is to live and survive in the Korean rural outdoors. It started its second season on November 12, 2011 featuring eight girls.

Th show is one of KBS's most watched shows online of all time.

Background

Season 1

The first season of the show involved Korean entertainers meeting weekly to work and learn about farming in a Yuchi-ri village in Hongcheon-gun, Gangwon Province in South Korea. This involved both agricultural work, interacting with members of an aging rural community, and competing in challenges involving agrarian or domestic tasks. As the show's popularity grew, the cast and crew began work to make their filming location a sustainable site for agritourism, enter produce in food competition, and promote environmentally conscious farming. Some of the products were sold within the local community, to the general public, or distributed as gifts.

The G7 girls initially included Narsha of Brown Eyed Girls, Sunhwa of Secret, Hyuna of 4Minute, Hyomin of T-ara, Sunny and Yuri of Girls' Generation, and Hara of Kara.

On Friday, May 14, 2010, the PD of the show Kim Ho-sang announced that Sunny, Yuri, and Hyuna would be leaving the show due to scheduling conflicts with their respective groups' overseas promotions. Their replacements were decided through private auditions with members of other K-pop girl groups.

On May 30, it was confirmed that After School's Jooyeon, f(x)’s Victoria and Kim Sori will become the three new members of G7 on Invincible Youth. Kim Jong-min (of Koyote) also became a semi-permanent member for a month under the moniker of being a "Variety show mentor" for the new members.

On the August 27th episode, it was announced that Kim Tae-woo will be taking a temporary leave of absence due to a surgery he is to receive for his throat. He vowed to come back to the show as soon as he makes a full recovery. Starting episode 44, Song Eun-i filled in as a semi-permanent MC in Kim Tae-woo's absence. On December 8, 2010, it was revealed that Invincible Youth finished recording their finale episode. They had filmed for over one year, since October 2009.

In an interview with Star News on December 10, production director (PD) Kim Sang-ho said, "We're not discontinuing the show because of low viewer ratings. There has been a lot of conflicting schedules due to girl groups like KARA expanding their activities overseas. It was difficult to take out some of the fixed members, so we decided to end season one for now. There's a lot of trust being placed on the worth of the Invincible Youth brand. After discussions with other producers, everyone agreed to end season one and go ahead with season two next year."

Season 1 Slogan: 청춘은 지지 않는다~ 청춘~ 불패 (Youth Don't Lose! Invincible Youth!)

Season 2
Executive producer (CP) Kim Ho-sang told Star News on August 31 that the second season will take place in a fishing village in Daebu Island, Ansan, Gyeonggi Province.

G8 members included Girls' Generation's Sunny and Hyoyeon, Amber (f(x)), Suzy (miss A), Bora (Sistar), Yewon (Jewelry), Ko Woo-ri (Rainbow), Jiyoung (Kara). Lee Soo-geun, Ji Hyun-woo and Boom served as MC's. Sunny is the only returning member from Season 1, although Hyoyeon, Jiyoung and Bora were guests during the previous season.

The first episode of Invincible Youth 2 premiered on November 12, 2011 in South Korea, while the international premiere on KBS World was on December 2, 2011.

Prior to the airing of the April 7th episode, multiple news reports were released confirming that cast members Lee Soo-geun, Ji Hyun-woo, Amber and Woori will be leaving the show. Season 1 cast member Kim Shin-young returned as an MC starting from the April 14th episode.

It was then later revealed that Sunny would also be leaving the show. As she was the only member from season 1, they agreed that she would stay on with season 2 until the program became somewhat stable. She left the show after the July 7th episode. Comedian Lee Young-ja was cast afterwards, starting with the July 21st episode.

Invincible Youth 2 stopped airing in mid-November due to scheduling conflicts with the cast members as well as low ratings. The final episode was filmed November 7 and aired on November 17.

Season 2 Slogan: 청춘이여 영원하라! 청춘~ 불패 (Youth is Forever! Invincible Youth!)

Invincible Youth members

Season 1

Hosts

G7 members
{| class="wikitable" width="68%"
|- style="background:#5E86C1; color:white" align=center
| style="width:10%"|Cast (Hangul)||style="width:10%"|Date||style="width:10%"|Nicknames||style="width:7%"|Group
|-
| Narsha (/) || 23 October 2009 – 24 December 2010||Adult-Dol  Reusha  Hyojin  Miss Laminate|| Brown Eyed Girls
|-
| Hyomin (/) || 23 October 2009 – 24 December 2010||Folding Screen  CEO (Completely Edited Out)  Wall flower Naming Master  Hyoderella || T-ara
|-
| Sunhwa || 23 October 2009 – 24 December 2010|| White Paper  Wet Feet Girl  Blank Sunhwa  Airhead Sunhwa || Secret
|-
| Hara || 23 October 2009 – 24 December 2010|| Haragoo  Goossain Bolt  Stealthy Hara  Quick-Mouth Hara  Thief Hara || Kara
|-
| Sunny (/)|| 23 October 2009 – 11 June 2010 || Soonkyu  Chicken Catcher Aegyo (Cute)|| Girls' Generation
|-
| Yuri|| 23 October 2009 – 11 June 2010 || Class-President Yul  Yoochi-ri Village's Daughter in Law  Yoga Instructor Yuri || Girls' Generation
|-
| Hyuna || 23 October 2009 – 11 June 2010 || Maknae  Producer Kim  Jing Jing (Whiny) Hyuna || 4Minute
|-
| Kim Sori || 18 June 2010 – 24 December 2010|| Vein Sori, Sona Lisa || Solo Artist
|-
| Victoria (//) || 18 June 2010 – 24 December 2010|| Wu Lin Girl  Censor Vic  Victory || f(x)
|-
| Jooyeon || 18 June 2010 – 24 December 2010|| Clumsy Jooyeon  Dead Weight (Jim) Jooyeon' || After School
|}

Season 2

Hosts

G8 members

List of special guests

 Season 1 

Season 2

Music
Season 1: During Season 1, a short clip of "I Can Do Better" by Avril Lavigne is played at the start of each episode. "Rockstar" by Miley Cyrus was used as an opening theme for a number of early episodes. A medley of songs by the American rock group Journey performed by the cast of the American television show Glee'' was used to open several of the final episodes. The ending theme of every episode is a track titled "All About You" by an English pop rock group named Mcfly.

Season 2: During Season 2 the ending theme for episode 1 through to episode 7 is "I'm Yours" by Jason Mraz. In subsequent episodes, the ending theme is "I Will" by The Beatles. After the cast change, it has since been replaced with promotions for PVs.

Awards

Other recognitions

Media release 
In Japan, Invincible Youth received a DVD release in 5 Volumes released on May 3, 2011 under Broadway Entertainment. The show was re-released in 9 volumes on June 3 of the same year. The second season was released in Japan in 11 volumes on August 05 and October 7, 2011.

KBS's official YouTube channel KBS World released the full show on YouTube on 2013. The first season gathered over 22,000,000 views while the second season experienced a drastic fall in views gathering only about 2,000,000 views. Overall the show amassed over 25,000,000 veiws making it one of the channel's most-watched shows of all time.

Notes and references

External links
   
 
 

South Korean reality television series
South Korean variety television shows
Korean Broadcasting System original programming
2009 South Korean television series debuts
Korean-language television shows